Ghaffarabad may refer to:
 Ghaffarabad, Kerman
 Ghaffarabad, Razavi Khorasan